The Bacolod Christian College of Negros, Inc. (BCCN), formerly known as the Bacolod Christian Center or BCC, is the first Baptist pre-school established in Bacolod, Negros Occidental, Philippines. It was founded on February 23, 1954, as a community center and pioneer Baptist pre-school.

History 
Bacolod Christian Center was founded in response to a need for a Christian outreach in the city and the province. Initially, the BCC offered a kindergarten, a game room, a basketball court, a small library, and a Bible class. Because of the need for workers in the Kasapulanan, the Christian Workers Training School (CWTS) gradually came into being. This was eventually merged with Convention Baptist Institute (CBI) and later became known as Convention Baptist Bible College (CBBC).

After Rev. Taylor and Catherine Neely left in 1957, Helen Markos took over in March 1957 as executive director. It was under her leadership that the center's program was molded to form the basis for future advancement. After Markos, Rev. Glenn Boice took over but later focused his attention on the Convention Bible Institute (CBI).

In 1959, Rev. Harold Blatt became the acting director; Henrietta Agustin (now Henrietta A. Nolido) joined the staff as his assistant. Upon the return of Blatt and his family to the United States in 1962, Nolido was appointed as executive director, a position she held until 1995.

Meanwhile, BCC was administered by officer-in-charge Racquel Alejo until Pastor Edwin Madlangbayan was appointed executive director in May 1996 until December 18, 2004. In school year 1994–1995, BCC commenced its elementary school; seven years later its secondary education department was opened. In March 2004, BCC graduated its first batch of high school students. In 1996, Mrs. Amparo Montalvo was designated as principal of the school until 2004.

On February 15, 2006, after a unanimous resolution passed by the board of trustees, Rev. Dr. Sergio A. Rojo Jr. was appointed as the new executive director of Bacolod Christian Center.

In March 2007, after the approval by the Securities and Exchange Commission, Bacolod Christian Center changed its name to Bacolod Christian College of Negros, Inc.

It offers pre-elementary, elementary, high school (junior and senior high), and college education. In SY 2007–2008, the student population reached 1,090.

External links 
 Official website
 

Educational institutions established in 1954
Universities and colleges in Bacolod
1954 establishments in the Philippines
Baptist schools in the Philippines